Paulhan is a commune in Hérault, Occitania, Southern France.

Its inhabitants are called Paulhanais (male) or Paulhanaises (female).

Population

Twin towns 
  Krailling, Germany
  Brezová pod Bradlom, Slovakia
  Košariská, Slovakia

See also
Communes of the Hérault department

References

Communes of Hérault